The members of the 26th Manitoba Legislature were elected in the Manitoba general election held in May 1959. The legislature sat from June 9, 1959, to November 9, 1962.

The Progressive Conservative Party led by Duff Roblin formed the government.

Douglas Lloyd Campbell of the Liberal-Progressive Party was Leader of the Opposition. After Campbell resigned in 1961, Gildas Molgat became opposition leader.

In 1961, the Liberal-Progressive Party became known as the Manitoba Liberal Party and the Co-operative Commonwealth Federation (CCF) was replaced by the New Democratic Party of Manitoba.

Abram Harrison served as speaker for the assembly.

There were five sessions of the 26th Legislature:

John Stewart McDiarmid was Lieutenant Governor of Manitoba until January 15, 1960, when Errick Willis became lieutenant governor.

Members of the Assembly 
The following members were elected to the assembly in 1959:

By-elections 
By-elections were held to replace members for various reasons:

Notes:

References 

Terms of the Manitoba Legislature
1959 establishments in Manitoba
1962 disestablishments in Manitoba